Sainte-Colombe (Vivaro-Alpine: Santa Colomba) is a commune in the Hautes-Alpes department in southeastern France. It is surrounded by mountains.

Population

See also
Communes of the Hautes-Alpes department

References

Communes of Hautes-Alpes